Iván Patricio Ledezma Ahumada (born 19 June 1995) is a Chilean footballer currently playing for Deportes Antofagasta of the Primera División de Chile.

External links
 

1995 births
Living people
Chilean footballers
Cobreloa footballers
Coquimbo Unido footballers
Audax Italiano footballers
Chilean Primera División players
Primera B de Chile players
Association football midfielders
People from Antofagasta